A list of films produced in Estonia ordered by year of release. For an alphabetical list of Estonian films, see :Category:Estonian films

 List of Estonian films before 1991
 List of Estonian films since 1991
 List of Estonian animated films
 List of Estonian war films

See also
 List of Estonian submissions for the Academy Award for Best International Feature Film